Alessia Polieri (born 21 October 1994) is an Italian swimmer. She competed in the women's 200 metre butterfly event at the 2016 Summer Olympics.

References

External links
 

1994 births
Living people
Italian female swimmers
Olympic swimmers of Italy
Swimmers at the 2016 Summer Olympics
People from Castel San Pietro Terme
Swimmers at the 2010 Summer Youth Olympics
Universiade medalists in swimming
Mediterranean Games bronze medalists for Italy
Mediterranean Games medalists in swimming
Swimmers at the 2018 Mediterranean Games
Universiade silver medalists for Italy
Medalists at the 2015 Summer Universiade
Sportspeople from the Metropolitan City of Bologna
20th-century Italian women
21st-century Italian women